Abby Rubenfeld (born 1953) is an American civil rights attorney who practices in Nashville, Tennessee.

Rubenfeld received an A.B. with honors from Princeton University, where she was class president, and a J.D. from Boston University School of Law in 1979, where she helped create the Boston University Law Association. She was admitted to practice law in 1979.

She challenged Tennessee's "Homosexual Practices Acts" law, which criminalized sodomy. The sodomy law was overturned in 1996. In 2013, she organized a group of attorneys and plaintiffs to challenge Tennessee's ban on same-sex marriage. She filed the lawsuit that led to Tennessee's inclusion in the U.S. Supreme Court case that legalized gay marriage nationwide.

She was an adjunct professor at Vanderbilt University Law School and chair of the Individual Rights and Responsibilities section of the American Bar Association.
She has served as a board member of the American Civil Liberties Union of Tennessee and the Human Rights Campaign. She was an attorney and Legal Director of Lambda Legal Defense and Education Fund, Inc.

Rubenfeld is the daughter of Milton Rubenfeld and the sister of actor Paul Reubens (born Paul Rubenfeld), best known for playing and creating the Pee-wee Herman character.  She is married, and has two daughters and a stepdaughter.

References

External links
Vanderbilt University website Faculty page for Abby Rubenfeld
Abby R. Rubenfeld Law Firm

1953 births
20th-century American Jews
American women lawyers
Boston University School of Law alumni
Civil liberties in the United States
Living people
People from Nashville, Tennessee
People from Oneonta, New York
Princeton University alumni
Vanderbilt University faculty
American women academics
21st-century American Jews